HD 9986 is a Sun-like star in the equatorial constellation of Pisces. With an apparent visual magnitude of 6.77, it lies below the normal limit for visibility with the naked eye. The star is located at a distance of 83 light years from the Sun as determined from parallax measurements, but it is drifting closer with a radial velocity of −21 km/s.

This object is a G-type main-sequence star with a stellar classification of G5 V, and is a near solar twin with physical properties very similar to the Sun's. It is around 3.3 billion years old and is spinning slowly with a rotation period of about 23 days. A speckle survey of G-dwarfs by Elliott P. Horch in 2002 noted that HD 9986 may not be non-single star.

References
 

G-type main-sequence stars
Solar analogs
Pisces (constellation)
Durchmusterung objects
009986
007585